Pi Upsilon Rho was a United States-based professional fraternity for homeopathy students established at Hahnemann Medical College in 1876 under the name Ustion.  It changed its name to Pi Upsilon Rho in 1909. 

By 1920 it had five active chapters. It has been credited as one of the United States' oldest medical fraternities. The fraternity's governing body, the Supreme Corpus, would meet annually at the convention of the American Institute of Homeopathy.

Symbols and traditions
Above this are three torches and below this are two crossed bones. An image of the badge is at the center of the Fraternity's crest.
The quarterly periodical of the fraternity was the Torch.
Chapters were named "Vertebrae", and were designated by Latin numerals.

Officers were named thusly:
Encephalon (President)
Medulla Oblongata (Vice-president)
Calamus Scriptorius (Secretary)
Optic Thalamus (Treasurer)
Torcular Herophili (Inductor)

Chapters

References

1876 establishments in Pennsylvania
Professional fraternities and sororities in the United States
Homeopathic organizations
Professional medical fraternities and sororities in the United States